Clistoabdominalis is a genus of flies in the family Pipunculidae.

Species
Clistoabdominalis ancylus Skevington, 2001
Clistoabdominalis angelikae Skevington, 2001
Clistoabdominalis arabicus Motamedina & Skevington, 2020
Clistoabdominalis ascitus (De Meyer, 1995)
Clistoabdominalis beneficiens (Perkins, 1905)
Clistoabdominalis capillifascis Skevington, 2001
Clistoabdominalis carnatistylus Skevington, 2001
Clistoabdominalis collessi Skevington, 2001
Clistoabdominalis colophus Skevington, 2001
Clistoabdominalis condylostylus Skevington, 2001
Clistoabdominalis danielsi Skevington, 2001
Clistoabdominalis dasymelus Skevington, 2001
Clistoabdominalis digitatus Skevington, 2001
Clistoabdominalis dilatatus (De Meyer, 1997)
Clistoabdominalis doczkali Kehlmaier, 2005
Clistoabdominalis eutrichodes (Perkins, 1906)
Clistoabdominalis exallus Skevington, 2001
Clistoabdominalis gaban Skevington, 2001
Clistoabdominalis gremialis Skevington, 2001
Clistoabdominalis helluo (Perkins, 1905)
Clistoabdominalis imitator (De Meyer, 1995)
Clistoabdominalis koebelei (Perkins, 1905)
Clistoabdominalis lambkinae Skevington, 2001
Clistoabdominalis lingulatus Skevington, 2001
Clistoabdominalis lomholdti Földvári, 2003
Clistoabdominalis macropygus (Meijere, 1914)
Clistoabdominalis mathiesoni Skevington, 2001
Clistoabdominalis mitarakensis Marques & Pollet, 2019
Clistoabdominalis monas (Perkins, 1905)
Clistoabdominalis nanus Motamedina & Skevington, 2020
Clistoabdominalis nitidifrons (Becker, 1900)
Clistoabdominalis nutatus Skevington, 2001
Clistoabdominalis octiparvus Skevington, 2001
Clistoabdominalis persicus Motamedina & Skevington, 2020
Clistoabdominalis platyphalligus Motamedina & Skevington, 2020
Clistoabdominalis reipublicae (Walker, 1849)
Clistoabdominalis roralis (Kertész, 1915)
Clistoabdominalis ruralis (Meigen, 1824)
Clistoabdominalis scalenus Skevington, 2001
Clistoabdominalis scintillatus Skevington, 2001
Clistoabdominalis sinaiensis (De Meyer, 1995)
Clistoabdominalis spinitibialis (Hardy, 1954)
Clistoabdominalis subruralis (Kozánek & Kwon, 1991)
Clistoabdominalis tasmanicus Skevington, 2001
Clistoabdominalis tharra Skevington, 2001
Clistoabdominalis tribulosus Motamedina & Skevington, 2020
Clistoabdominalis trochanteratus (Becker, 1900)
Clistoabdominalis tumidus (De Meyer, 1997)
Clistoabdominalis uniformis (Brunetti, 1917)
Clistoabdominalis uzbekistanus (Kozánek, 1988)
Clistoabdominalis yeatesi Skevington, 2001

References

Pipunculidae
Brachycera genera
Diptera of Europe
Diptera of Asia
Diptera of Africa
Diptera of Australasia